Bromal (tribromoacetaldehyde) is a brominated aldehyde. It reacts with water to form bromal hydrate.

See also
Chloral
Chloral hydrate

References

Aldehydes
Tribromomethyl compounds